Herman Brooks (December 4, 1886 – death date unknown) was an American Negro league outfielder in the 1900s.

A native of Muchakinock, Iowa, Brooks played for the Buxton Wonders in 1909. In three recorded games, he posted two hits in 11 plate appearances.

References

External links
Baseball statistics and player information from Baseball-Reference Black Baseball Stats and Seamheads

1886 births
Year of death missing
Place of death missing
Buxton Wonders players